Site-specific DNA-methyltransferase (cytosine-N4-specific) (modification methylase, restriction-modification system, DNA[cytosine-N4]methyltransferase, m4C-forming MTase, S-adenosyl-L-methionine:DNA-cytosine 4-N-methyltransferase) is an enzyme with systematic name S-adenosyl-L-methionine:DNA-cytosine N4-methyltransferase. This enzyme catalyses the following chemical reaction

 S-adenosyl-L-methionine + DNA cytosine  S-adenosyl-L-homocysteine + DNA N4-methylcytosine

This is a large group of enzymes.

See also 
 DNA methyltransferase

References

External links 
 

EC 2.1.1